Corruption Watch is a South African anti-corruption non-profit organisation that sets out to monitor and expose acts of corruption that involve public resources and donated charitable resources in South Africa. The various focus areas in which the organisation monitors and exposes corruption include corruption in the education sector, police corruption, leadership appointments (mainly in institutions that support democracy), corruption in the mining applications processes and its effects of communities, corruption in land ownership and tenure, and public procurement. Whistle-blowers are an essential source for the organisation as their whole operational mode is built upon reports received from whistle-blowers. Corruption Watch is a chapter of Transparency International, and is not affiliated with Corruption Watch (UK).

History
Corruption Watch was launched in January 2012 at the initiative of trade union federation COSATU (the Congress of South African Trade Unions) https://www.corruptionwatch.org.za/cosatu-welcomes-launch-of-corruption-watch/. The launch, which was held at Constitution Hill in Johannesburg, was attended by a range of government officials, including former minister of Justice and Correctional Services of South Africa Jeff Radebe, civil society, and business leaders including Jay Naidoo, Mark Haywood, Mary Metcalfe and Njongonkulu Ndungane, and a range of mainstream media organisations. 

In his keynote speech, former COSATU secretary-general Zwelinzima Vavi lauded Corruption Watch as a "Critical intervention of COSATU and civil society that will help empower our people and successfully mobilise them." Former justice minister Jeff Radebe also took to the podium, decrying corruption as a "cancer" in South African society in his speech. David Lewis, founding executive director of Corruption Watch, said: "We have formed this organisation to enable citizens to report and confront public and private sector individuals abusing their power and position.”

Activities
Corruption Watch operates a reporting system which encourages members of the public to share their experiences of corruption through SMS, fax, e-mail or online through its website, mobi-site, or Facebook page. It is modelled on similar schemes like I paid a Bribe in India. The organisation uses this information in various ways, including research, preparing contributions to legislative or policy development, undertaking strategic litigation on matters that are in the public interest, investigating a selected number of reports (of necessity this number is limited because of resource constraints), developing campaigns, and more.

Corruption Watch collaborates with various South African institutions that are charged with supporting democracy or dealing with corruption, such as the Public Protector and the Special Investigating Unit. 

Whistle-blowers are the primary source of information for Corruption Watch but sometimes the organisation conducts its own investigations and reports are created based on those findings. The key reports that Corruption Watch produces are annual reports, the Analysis of Corruption Trends (ACT) report series, sectoral reports - one each year - each focusing on a different sector, the Transparency in Corporate Reporting (TRAC) report series, and various research reports which all accessible from this link: https://www.corruptionwatch.org.za/reading-and-media-room/). Corruption Watch also produces public education material, usually related to the campaigns that they are busy with or focus areas.

In 2016, Corruption Watch added its voice to calls for the resignation of former President Zuma, stating that he was not doing enough to prevent corruption by public officials.

How work is done

Communication
Corruption Watch provides a platform for reporting corruption. Anyone can safely share what they experience and observe and can speak out against corruption. The available communication channels include Corruption Watch's website, a WhatsApp number, social media, e-mail or post. Walk-ins are permitted; however, they are limited to certain days, namely Mondays and Tuesdays as the team mostly works remotely due to Covid-19.  

Investigation
The organisation investigates selected reports of alleged acts of corruption, in particular those cases that have the most serious impact on society. For instance, these may be cases involving basic health or education services which affect the most disadvantaged South Africans. Corruption Watch hands its findings over to the relevant authorities to take further action, and monitors the progress of each case. The organisation also collaborates with mainstream and community media to make sure that corruption is fully exposed through its investigative work.

Research
Corruption Watch gathers and analyses information to identify patterns and hot spots of corruption. The organisation prepares research reports on these hot spots to expose and find solutions to systemic corruption. Using its own communication platforms and the media, Corruption Watch shares its findings with the public, like-minded non-governmental organisations, and public sector bodies, all of which are stakeholders in the fight against corruption.

Mobilisation
Corruption Watch builds campaigns that mobilise people to take a stand against corruption. Campaigns involve the public, community groups, and other organisations such as civil society entities.

A list of major projects
The daily coverage of the erstwhile Zondo commission, and the analysis of the reports which can be found at: https://www.corruptionwatch.org.za/zondo-commission-updates-analysis-and-other-material/.

Contributions to Policy and Legislation which can be found at: https://www.corruptionwatch.org.za/category/our-work/policy-and-advocacy/ and
https://www.corruptionwatch.org.za/category/our-work/policy-and-legislation/.

Involvement in The People's Tribunal on Economic Crime, found at: https://www.corruptionwatch.org.za/five-days-gripping-tribunal-hearings/.

E-books that target the youth: https://www.corruptionwatch.org.za/download-our-fundza-youth-stories-as-e-books/. 

Strategic litigation that is in the public interest, main focus areas being, the social grants saga, Sanral in Cape Town, and the Seriti commission report, which can be found at:
https://www.corruptionwatch.org.za/cw-in-concourt-again-for-r10-billion-tender/

https://www.corruptionwatch.org.za/cw-in-successful-r10-billion-tender-appeal/ 

https://www.corruptionwatch.org.za/corruption-watch-wants-bid-payment-to-cps-set-aside/ 

https://www.corruptionwatch.org.za/corruption-watch-celebrates-supreme-court-ruling-on-cps-repayment-to-sassa/

https://www.corruptionwatch.org.za/cw-and-r2k-celebrate-arms-deal-victory-in-court-today/ 

https://www.corruptionwatch.org.za/seriti-commissions-findings-set-aside/ 

https://www.corruptionwatch.org.za/civil-society-organisations-challenge-high-court/
 
https://www.corruptionwatch.org.za/success-in-legal-challenge-to-sanral-secrecy-ruling/ 

Coverage of the Arms Deal commission (Seriti Commission), found at: https://www.corruptionwatch.org.za/the-arms-deal-what-you-need-to-know-2/.

The Richard Mdluli matter and the Eskom delinquency case - reports can be found at the following links:  
https://www.corruptionwatch.org.za/after-two-decades-of-evasion-mdluli-bites-the-dust/ (Mdluli)
https://www.corruptionwatch.org.za/joint-application-to-intervene-in-mdluli-matter/ (Mdluli)
https://www.corruptionwatch.org.za/cw-files-delinquency-application-in-respect-of-eskom-board/ (Eskom)
https://www.corruptionwatch.org.za/all-cws-correspondence-in-our-eskom-delinquency-application/ (Eskom)

Use of technology projects: The Veza tool: https://www.veza.org.za/
Procurement Watch (it is not publicly available, but two reports have been produced from its data - https://www.corruptionwatch.org.za/new-cw-report-raises-red-flags-potential-risks-in-procurement-processes/ and https://www.corruptionwatch.org.za/new-cw-report-on-trends-in-procurement-deviations-expansions-and-debarment/. 

The organisation also promotes public involvement in the political process,  and lobbies for the development of regulatory processes for transparency in government spending. 

Corruption Watch (SA) is funded by donations from a range of private philanthropic foundations and businesses. It has a small staff of fewer than 30 people and is located in South Point Central, Braamfontein, Johannesburg.

 Prof Mzukisi Qobo is acting chairperson of the organisation.

See also 
 ACCU Uganda
 Botswana Center for Public Integrity
Transparency International

References

Further reading

External links
 

Civic and political organisations of South Africa
Anti-corruption non-governmental organizations
Corruption in South Africa